Alexandrovsky is a rural locality (a settlement) in Sovkhozny Selsoviet, Aleysky District, Altai Krai, Russia. The population was 348 as of 2013. There are 15 streets.

Geography 
Alexandrovsky is located 26 km southeast of Aleysk (the district's administrative centre) by road. Sovkhozny is the nearest rural locality.

References 

Rural localities in Aleysky District